Rhinella fernandezae is a species of toad in the family Bufonidae that is found in Argentina, Brazil, Paraguay, and Uruguay.
Its natural habitats are subtropical or tropical dry lowland grassland, subtropical or tropical seasonally wet or flooded lowland grassland, intermittent freshwater marshes, coastal freshwater lagoons, arable land, pastureland, plantations, and seasonally flooded agricultural land.

References

fernandezae
Amphibians described in 1957
Amphibians of Argentina
Amphibians of Brazil
Amphibians of Paraguay
Amphibians of Uruguay
Fauna of the Pantanal
Taxonomy articles created by Polbot